Arbor(s) or Arbour(s) may refer to:

Arts and entertainment
 Arbor (installation), a 2013 public artwork in Indianapolis, Indiana, US
 Arbor, a counterweight-carrying device found in theater fly systems
 The Arbor, a 1980 play by Andrea Dunbar; also the title of a 2010 film about Dunbar
 The Arbor, a 1930 play by Hermann Ungar
 The Arbors, a 1960s pop group

Companies
 Arbor Drugs, a defunct American drug store chain based in Troy, Michigan
 Arbor Networks, an American software company
 Arbors Records, an American jazz record label

Horticulture
 Arbor (garden), a landscape structure
 Grove (nature), a small group of trees

Places
 Arbor, Missouri, US
 Arbor, Nebraska, US
 Arbor, Texas, or Arbor Grove, US

Other uses
 Arbor (tool) or mandrel
 Arbour (surname)
 Arbor, the central post of a fishing reel to which fishing line is attached
 Arbor knot, a knot commonly used to attach fishing line to a fishing reel

See also
 Arbor Day, a day for planting trees
 Arbor vitae (disambiguation)
 Arboretum, a botanical garden primarily devoted to woody plants
 Arboriculture, the study of trees